Chaklala is a major suburban town of Rawalpindi in the Punjab province of Pakistan.

It is situated astride the Airport Road, to the east of Grand Trunk Road on the main railway line. The town has its own railway station Chaklala Railway Station which is located less than 1 kilometer away from Benazir Bhutto International Airport. 

Chaklala is under the municipal administration of Chaklala Cantonment Board (CCB) which provides water, sewage treatment and road improvements in the area along with maintaining parks and green areas. This is separate from the other two municipal authorities i.e Rawalpindi Cantonment Board (RCB) and Rawalpindi Metropolitan Corporation which make up the metropolitan city of Rawalpindi

The area also has modern housing schemes namely Gulzar-e-Quaid, Chaklala Housing Schemes I, II & III, Askari - I, II, III, IV, V, VI, VIII, IX, X & XII with a rapidly diminishing rural area.

There is a large commercial market situated in Chaklala Scheme III which is the major shopping area for all the residents in Chaklala. The market comprises a lot of restaurants and shopping areas and a hang out spot for the younger people. There is also a cinema and retail complex located in Jinnah Park on the airport road which is another area where residents venture out during evenings.

Demography 
Chaklala has a population of around 407,952 according to the latest 2017 census. 

The major ethnic groups in the area are Potohari, Punjabis and Pashtuns. A large number of Kashmiris have also settled in the area after independence in 1947. Since Chaklala is a major army garrison and an airforce base as well, a large number of military families are also housed here from all over Pakistan. Chaklala Airforce Base provides strategic transport to Pakistan's political and military leadership.

Chaklala Cantonment 

Chaklala Cantonment is the cantonment area located in Chaklala, Pakistan. It is home to a Pakistan Army garrison and a Pakistan Air Force base, along with Pakistan Armed Forces Joint Staff Headquarters, depots and workshops, most of them present since the British era. Chaklala Cantonment was split from the larger Rawalpindi Cantonment in 2002 to improve administration in the cantonment areas of the military capital of Pakistan. Before 2002, Rawalpindi Cantonment was the largest of all cantonments in Pakistan which was creating administrative problems in providing municipal services due to rapid urban growth. 
 
Chaklala Airbase, recently re-named as PAF Base Nur Khan, is an important air base of the Pakistan Air Force. The headquarters of the Joint Chiefs of Staff Committee, Pakistan are located in the high-security Pakistan Army garrison.

Transportation

Roads

Grand Trunk Road

Grand Trunk Road (N-5) passes through the area.

Airport Road
This major route connects the area with the city center of Rawalpindi and provides a route to the capital city of Islamabad. It extends from the Ammar Shaheed Chowk Roundabout to the Koraal Chowk/Koraal Chowk Intersection. The Benazir Bhutto International Airport and the adjacent Pakistan Air Force Base Chaklala are located along this road. It is a modern six-lane road. Two fly-overs have been constructed to reduce the load of traffic at the busiest sections of the road, closer to the Ammar Shaheed Chowk Roundabout (2009) and at Koral Chowk (2017), respectively. The route serves as the main artery connecting the twin cities of Rawalpindi and Islamabad.

Rawal Road
It runs along the western perimeter of the Benazir Bhutto International Airport. The road connects the busy traffic arteries of Benazir Bhutto Road alternatively known as Murree Road and Airport Road. It is a newly carpeted four-lane road.

Railway 
Railway line of Pakistan Railways passes through the town. The area has a railway station, the Chaklala Railway Station.  An associated strategic dry port, the Chaklala Dry Port, handles cargo trains.

Air 
Benazir Bhutto International Airport is an important landmark of the area, located at Chaklala which is technically a part of Rawalpindi.

Parks

In 2006, Jinnah Park was inaugurated in Chaklala and has since become a hotspot of activity for the city of Rawalpindi. It houses a state-of-the-art cinema, Cinepax, a Metro Cash and Carry supermart, an outlet of McDonald's, gaming lounges, Motion Rides and other recreational facilities. The vast lawns also provide an adequate picnic spot.

Pakistan Television Corporation 
Pakistan Television Corporation's Islamabad Centre was initially set up at Chaklala before it was shifted to its present location in Islamabad.

Educational institutions 
 Army Public School & College For Boys Chaklala Garrison 
 Army Public School & College For Girls Chaklala Garrison
 Joint Staff Public School and College, Chaklala
 FG Quaid-e-Azam Public School
 Fazaia Intermediate College, Chaklala (PAF Base Chaklala)
 Fazaia Intermediate College, Jinnah Camp, Chaklala (Khanna Road)
 Bilquis College of Education for Women (Mujahida Academy)
 Army Public School and College (FWO campus), Gracy Lines, Chaklala
 FG Boys High School, Gracy Lines, Chaklala
 FG Girls High School, Gracy Lines, Chaklala
 Fauji Foundation Model School, Chaklala
 Sir Syed Science College, Chaklala
 Allied Schools, Chaklala
 Army Public School 
 JS Public School
 FG Public School
 Army Public School
Government Degree College For Women
The Educators School System, Airport Road Campus

References

External links

Chaklala Cantonment
Towns in Rawalpindi District